My Son, My Son (also titled as O Absalom) is a 1938 novel by the British writer Howard Spring.

Adaptations
In 1940 it was made into an American film My Son, My Son! released by United Artists and starring Madeleine Carroll and Brian Aherne. In 1979 it was again adapted as a BBC television series My Son, My Son.

References

Bibliography
 Goble, Alan. The Complete Index to Literary Sources in Film. Walter de Gruyter, 1999.
 George Watson & Ian R. Willison. The New Cambridge Bibliography of English Literature, Volume 4. CUP, 1972.

1938 British novels
Novels by Howard Spring
British novels adapted into films
British novels adapted into television shows
William Collins, Sons books